The 2000 United States state legislative elections were held on November 7, 2000, simultaneously with the 2000 United States presidential election. Elections were held for 86 legislative chambers in 44 states, simultaneous to those states' gubernatorial elections. Election occurred in both chambers of each state's legislature, except for Alabama, Louisiana, Maryland, Mississippi, New Jersey, and Virginia. Michigan held elections for the lower house. Six territorial chambers in four territories and the District of Columbia were up as well.  

Democrats won control of the Colorado Senate for the first time since 1963. Republicans won control of the Missouri Senate for the first time since 1949, the New Hampshire Senate which was previously tied, the South Carolina Senate for the first time since 1879, and the Vermont House of Representatives. 

Additionally, a coalition government replaced the Republican-controlled Arizona Senate, and the Democratic-controlled Maine Senate became tied.

Summary table
Regularly-scheduled elections were held in 86 of the 99 state legislative chambers in the United States. Nationwide, regularly-scheduled elections were held for 6,015 of the 7,383 legislative seats. Many legislative chambers held elections for all seats, but some legislative chambers that use staggered elections held elections for only a portion of the total seats in the chamber. The chambers not up for election either hold regularly-scheduled elections in odd-numbered years, or have four-year terms and hold all regularly-scheduled elections in presidential midterm election years.

Note that this table only covers regularly-scheduled elections; additional special elections took place concurrently with these regularly-scheduled elections.

Results

State-by-state

Upper houses

Lower houses

Results

Territorial chambers

Upper houses

Lower houses

Unicameral

Notes

References

 
 
State legislative elections
State legislature elections in the United States by year